George Edward Richardson (born 4 July 1902 in Easington, County Durham) was a professional footballer, who played for Newcastle United, Huddersfield Town, Sheffield Wednesday, York City and Bradford City.

References

1902 births
Sportspeople from Easington, County Durham
Footballers from County Durham
Year of death missing
English footballers
Association football midfielders
South Shields F.C. (1889) players
Newcastle United F.C. players
Huddersfield Town A.F.C. players
Sheffield Wednesday F.C. players
York City F.C. players
Bradford City A.F.C. players
Ashington A.F.C. players
Easington Colliery A.F.C. players
Whitburn Junior F.C. players
English Football League players
Midland Football League players